Admiral Levchenko is a Russian destroyer of the . The ship was laid down in 1982 and was commissioned in the Soviet Navy in 1988. After the fall of the Soviet Union the ship continued to serve in the Russian Navy with the Northern Fleet. She was named after admiral Gordey Levchenko.

In 2010 Admiral Levchenko was part of the Russian operations to combat piracy off the Somali coast.

By 2020, she was reported inactive due to an overhaul. The overhaul includes upgrading ship's fire-fighting systems, onboard electronics, new cooling units and shut-off valves. The ship should also receive Russia's newest "Otvet" anti-submarine missile system. She was expected to return to service in late 2022 but was reported active post-refit as of May 2022.

On 26 May 2022, the destroyer conducted exercises in the Barents Sea.

On 8 September 2022, Admiral Levchenko held exercises along the Northern Sea Route, along with LST Aleksandr Otrakovsky, tanker Sergey Osipov and tug Pamir. On 10 October, the three ships returned to Severomorsk.

References

External links

1985 ships
Udaloy-class destroyers
Destroyers of the Russian Navy
Cold War destroyers of the Soviet Union
Ships built at Severnaya Verf